Irish-Scots are people in Scotland who have traceable Irish ancestry. Although there has been migration from Ireland (especially Ulster) to Britain for millennia, Irish migration to Scotland increased in the nineteenth century, and was highest following the Great Famine. In this period, the Irish typically settled in cities and industrial areas. Irish ancestry is by far the most common foreign ancestry in Scotland. 

Famous Irish-Scots include socialist revolutionary James Connolly, author Sir Arthur Conan Doyle, left-wing politician George Galloway, actors Sean Connery, Brian Cox, Peter Capaldi and Gerard Butler, musicians Gerry Rafferty, Maggie Reilly, Jimme O'Neill, Clare Grogan and Fran Healy and stand-up comedians Sir Billy Connolly and Frankie Boyle.

The term Irish-Scots should not be confused with Ulster-Scots (sometimes known as Scots-Irish), a term used to denote those in the Irish province of Ulster who are descended from Lowland Scots who settled there in large numbers during the Plantation of Ulster and subsequently.

Background
Attitudes to the waves of immigration from Ireland to Scotland were mixed, as evidenced by the following quotations:

Difficulties also arose due to differences between the largely Catholic immigrants and the predominantly Protestant native Scots population. Towards the end of the eighteenth century, before the Irish began arriving in large numbers it was reported that, in Glasgow, there were only thirty-nine Catholics, but forty-three anti-Catholic clubs (see ).

In the UK census of 2001, the new category "Irish" was added to the list of white ethnic background. In Scotland, results showed that 49,428 (0.98%), fewer than 1% of the population, self-described as being of Irish background.

The Irish-Scots were instrumental in the formation of Hibernian F.C. in Edinburgh in 1875. There followed in 1888 in Glasgow, Celtic Football Club, founded with the purpose of alleviating poverty in the immigrant Irish population in the East End of Glasgow and later Dundee United F.C. (originally known as Dundee Hibernian), as well as numerous smaller teams. These football teams were originally formed to provide recreational facilities for the Irish immigrants.

Scots and Irish
The terms Scots and Irish, while they have a settled meaning today, are not always readily distinguished. Sellar & Yeatman's spoof history 1066 and All That highlighted the confusion that these words can cause when used to refer to the past :

See also
 The Irish Scots and the Scotch-Irish – John C. Linehan

References

External links
 Material in "Mi Deireadh Fomhair" (October 2004)  includes the full text of the song "Hello! Patsy Fagan" (or "The Dacent Irish Boy") by T. P. Keenan, describing the experiences of an Irish immigrant in Glasgow
 Audio podcast about the history of Irish radicalism in Scotland

Social history of Ireland
I